Leonardo Paniagua is one of the Dominican Republic's most popular bachata musicians. He emerged from obscurity to overnight stardom in the 1970s, when he recorded his first 45rpm record, "Amada, Amante" for Discos Guarachita.

Throughout the 1970s and 1980s, Paniagua's bachata albums were the best-selling. With his soft voice and romantic style, he appealed beyond bachata's usual working-class audience. He was also one of the first artists to form a movement of romantic-bachateros, artists who helped the genre emerge into mainstream music.

Paniagua still tours and performs today in the US, Europe, and the Dominican Republic.

He recently played with his orchestra at one of several inaugural events in Arecibo, Puerto Rico's well known Pulguero Bajo Techo. (Puerto Rico's largest roofed flea market) and at Stratford, CT on 4/27/2018.

Albums

 Con el Conjunto Paredes (1973)

 El Casamiento
 Dame la Mano
 Tus Ojos
 El Porcentaje
 Déjame Si Estoy Llorando
 Es Tu Día Feliz
 Amor Por Ti
 Regresa Corazón
 Hoy Comprendí
 Locura, Locura

 Vol. 2 (1976)

 La Cruz del Olvido
 Madre, Cuando Quieras Voy a Verte
 Querida
 Ven Te Quiero Todavía
 Estoy Celoso
 No Vendrás
 Me Estoy Volviendo Tuyo
 Mi Secreto
 Cenizas
 Amor Imposible

 Sus Primeros Éxitos Vol. 3 (1977)

 Me Muero Por Estar Contigo
 Si Yo Fuera Ese
 Él o Yo
 Mi Arbolito
 Locuras Tengo de Ti
 Por Esa Puerta
 Si Ardiera la Ciudad
 Los Hombres No Deben Llorar
 Un Beso y Una Flor
 Te Acordarás de Mi
 Por el Amor de Una Mujer
 Dios del Olvido

 Con el Conjunto Paredes Vol. 4 (1977)

 Nunca Más Podré Olvidarte
 Olvidarte Nunca
 Insaciable
 Qué Será
 Si Supieras
 Te Extrañaré Por Siempre
 Por Mi Orgullo
 Alguien Como Yo
 El Anillo
 Tantos Deseos de Ella
 Me Estoy Acostumbrando a Ti
 Chirry

 Con el Conjunto Paredes Vol. 5 (1978)

 Brunilda
 Sin Remedio
 Por Culpa de Tu Amor
 Recordando el Pasado
 El Necio
 Que Debo Hacer
 En el Rincón Aquel
 Vamos a Platicar
 Yo Nací Para Quererte
 Quiero Llorar
 Amada Amante

 Leonardo Paniagua (1978)

 Él
 Nunca Supe la Verdad
 De Rodillas
 Cada Día Más
 Para Bien o Para Mal
 Noche Amarga
 Ven a Mi
 Entre Tu Amor y Mi Amor
 A Tu Orden
 Quien Lleva los Pantalones

 Con el Conjunto Paredes Vol. 6 (1979)

 Pedacito de Mi Vida
 Acaríciame
 Querida Mía
 Como Ayer Amantes
 Yo No Me Muero
 Sigue Con Tu Dinero
 Páginas del Alma
 Somos de los Dos
 Algo de Mi
 Olvida Tu Rencor

 Chiquitita Vol. 7 (1979)

 Chiquitita
 Amor de Llanto
 No Te Olvides de Mi
 Cómo Te Ha Ido
 Bailando Con Otra
 Dime Si Vendrás Esta Navidad
 Sin Ti
 Yo Soy Tu Hombre
 Flor Sin Aroma
 Te Quise Tanto

 Navidades Con Paniagua Vol. 8 (1979)

 Navidad Con Navidad
 El Tiempo Que Te Quede Libre
 El Concón
 Sin Derecho y Con Razón
 Merengue de Navidad
 Ven Llegando
 Cierra los Ojos
 Cuando Quieras Dejarme
 Obsesión
 Nació Jesús

 Vol. 9 (1980)

 Mujer Borincana
 Que Fui Tu Amor
 Ya Me Olvidé de Ti
 Presiento Que Muero
 Toda Una Vida
 Tu Nieto
 Que Te Vaya Bien
 Ya Se Fue
 Amorcito De Mi Vida
 De Carne y Hueso

 Señor Paniagua Vol. 10 (1980)

 Amémonos
 Quién Lleva los Pantalones
 Salud Cariño
 Cada Día Más
 Él
 A Tu Orden
 A Media Noche
 Mala, Muy Mala
 De Rodillas
 Para Bien o Para Mal
 Homenaje a Nino Bravo
 Domingo en la Tarde

 Con Mariachi Vol. 11 (1981)

 Mi Amigo
 Atrévete
 Silencio
 Voy a Perder la Cabeza Por Tu Amor
 Vendaval Sin Rumbo
 Desahogo
 De Ti Mujer
 Sera
 Esta Sed Que Tengo
 Que Se Mueran de Envidia

 Con el Conjunto Paredes Vol. 12 (1982)

 Yo Pago Esta Noche
 Brindemos
 Perdona
 No Hay Nada Tan Hermoso
 Hoy No Estoy Para Nadie
 Regresarás
 Rueda de Amor
 Como Yo Te Amo
 Cuatro Paredes
 La Primera Página

 En Acción Vol. 13 (1982)

 Todo Se Derrumbó Dentro de Mi
 Mientras Tanto
 Mañana Sabré
 Para Volverte a Ver
 Como Es Posible
 Que Quieres Tú de Mi
 Una Más Allá
 Si Te Digo Que Te He Olvidado
 Amándote
 Como Sufro al Recordar

 El Amargue Vol. 15 (1983)

 Nuestro Loco Amor
 Yo Necesito Hablar Contigo
 No Me Desprecies
 Aunque No Te Puedo Hablar
 Mujeres de Mi Pueblo
 Desengañado
 Súplica
 Ahora Me Voy
 Que Dios Te Aleje de Mi
 Lágrimas Fingidas

 12 Éxitos Románticos del Momento Vol. 14 (1983)

 Dueño de Nada
 Que Tal Te Va Sin Mi
 Me Basta
 Con el Alma Desnuda
 Para Vivir
 Haz Amigo el Favor
 Esa Mujer
 El Amor
 Si
 Equivocada
 Amargado Por Ti
 Dime Papá

 El Gusto del Pueblo (1984)

 María
 Cóncavo y Convexo
 Ella Se Llamaba Marta  
 Que Dios Te Aleje de Mi 
 Mi Vida
 Te Vas 
 Tú Si Sabes Amar
 Acuérdate
 Tu Foto en la Pared
 Cuando Tú No Estás

 Más Música Para el Pueblo (1985)

 Me Tienes Que Recordar
 Y Tú Te Vas
 Feliz Su Cumpleaños
 Volveré a Saludarte
 Perdido
 No Me Dejes de Querer
 Lo Dudo
 No Vales la Pena
 Mis Ojos Dicen Que Te Quiero
 Cómo Te Ha Ido

 Paniagua... De Nuevo! (1986)

 De Corazón a Corazón
 Me Enseñaste a Querer
 Aprenderé a Soñar
 No Me Pidas Que Te Olvide
 Gracias Mi Amor
 Pena Por Ti
 Tu Mirada Serena
 Cara Bonita
 De Ti Me Enamoré
 Sueño Con Besar Tu Boca

 14 Éxitos (1987)

 Dos Rosas
 Chiquitita
 Brunilda
 De Corazón a Corazón
 Sin Ti
 Quien Lleva los Pantalones
 Tantos Deseos de Ella
 Un Beso y Una Flor
 Nunca Más Podré Olvidarte
 Si Ardiera la Ciudad
 Desahogo
 Quiero Llorar
 A Media Noche
 La Cruz del Olvido

 Prohibido (1988)

 Prohibido
 Me Enseñaste el Amor
 Que No Se Rompa la Noche
 Pueblo Lejano
 Dos En Uno
 Quien Puede Ser
 Tu Sonrisa Me Provoca
 No Me Explico
 Plazos Traicioneros
 José Luis

 Un Saludo a Puerto Rico (1989)

 Mis Amores
 Tu Juguetito
 Preciosa
 Sin Ti Soy Nada
 Desde Que Yo Te Conocí
 La Cama Vacía
 Obsesión
 La Última Copa
 Sigamos Pecando
 Cuando Tú No Estás

 Si Me Vas a Olvidar (1990)

 Si Me Vas a Olvidar
 Te Amo
 A Donde Vayas
 Me Recordarás
 Quiero Hacerte el Amor
 El Que Más Te Ha Querido
 La Incondicional
 Con Ella
 Después de Ti
 Te Dirán

 Por Ti Mi Amor (1991)

 El Cariño Es Como Una Flor
 Desencanto
 Olvídate de Mi
 Llorando Se Fue
 Burbujas de Amor
 Por Ti Mi Amor
 Entre Copas
 Dame Una Miradita
 Crees Que Canto Por Ti
 El Primero En Tu Vida

References

External links
Leonardo Paniagua bio & audio/video clips
Profile at Bachata Republic

Bachata musicians
Year of birth missing (living people)
Living people
20th-century Dominican Republic male singers
Place of birth missing (living people)